Bloomington High School South (simply referred to as BHSS or South) is a public high school in Bloomington, Indiana, United States. It is part of the Monroe County Community School Corporation.

History 
Bloomington High School South originated as Bloomington High School, or BHS. BHS was a prep school for Indiana University until University High School was built in the 1930s, which allowed BHS to become a general high school. It was housed, for many years, in a three-story brick building at Seminary Square Park, and was considered Bloomington's central high school in 1864. As Bloomington grew, BHS got and slowly evolved. The Gothic year book began in 1909 and The Optimist newspaper in 1911. Both were started at BHS and are still published as of 2021.

In 1965, a new high school building was built for BHS on South Walnut Street. When BHS vacated Seminary Square, the old building was turned into a middle school called Central Junior High School. On April 6, 1967, an arsonist burned down the building, completely destroying it, and the present park was created on the site.

In 1972, University High School and Unionville High School (the closest county high school outside the city of Bloomington) were closed along with Smithville High School. "South" was added to BHS to create "Bloomington High School South," (BHSS) complete with mascot and school colors (purple and white), similar to that of the former BHS.

Later, the fall of that same year, as a result of the 1968 school consolidation plan which formed the Monroe County Community School Corporation, Bloomington High School North (BHSN) was built with students from the closed University and Unionville High Schools along with some transfer students from BHSS.

The zonal boundary that determines which Bloomington high school a student will attend forms a jagged line that intersects the city. The zoning is such that one student who actually lives north of another, may in fact attend "South", while the other attends "North". This geographic divide was contentious given that the MCCSC school board decided to send the most prominent socioeconomic neighborhood (Hyde Park) to North to reduce in economic/academic inequity. The map can be obtained from the Monroe County Community School Corporation. The two schools have remained contentious rivals in most sporting events since the creation of BHSN in 1972.

Athletics 
The Panthers compete in the Conference Indiana, with their main rival being the cross-town Bloomington High School North Cougars. They have won a total of 29 IHSAA Championships, tied for the 5th most in the state.

Extracurricular activities

Music 
The Bloomington South and Bloomington North string orchestras together form the Hoosier Youth Philharmonic, which has performed nationally and internationally, including a concert at Carnegie Hall on March 14, 2012.

Notable alumni 
 David Shuster, journalist and talk radio host
 Rex Grossman, NFL player
 Hoagy Carmichael, singer, songwriter, and actor
 Meg Cabot, author
 Jordan Hulls, professional basketball player
 Liz Watson, attorney and politician
 Darwin Davis, professional basketball player
 Steve Kinser, former professional racecar driver
Anthony Leal, collegiate basketball player
Daniel Larsen, mathematician

References

External links 
 

Schools in Monroe County, Indiana
Public high schools in Indiana
Former Southern Indiana Athletic Conference members
Buildings and structures in Bloomington, Indiana